"Power Is Power" is a song by American singer SZA, Canadian singer the Weeknd, and American rapper and singer Travis Scott. It was released as the lead single from the Game of Thrones companion soundtrack, For the Throne, on April 18, 2019.

Background and release
In early April of that year, rumours regarding the possibility of a Game of Thrones inspired track by SZA, the Weeknd, and Travis Scott began to circulate around the web. The artists' involvement on the For the Throne soundtrack was then later confirmed on April 8, via an announcement of the soundtrack by Columbia Records. Following the release of the promotional singles "Kingdom of One" by Maren Morris and "Nightshade" by The Lumineers on April 12, SZA then later shared the cover art and release date of the song, on her Instagram profile on April 16.

Composition and lyrics
The title of the song is a line spoken by the character Cersei Lannister in the HBO TV series Game of Thrones, the song's lyric however revolve around the character Jon Snow. Writers at the time interpreted the lyrics as possibly foreshadowing the aforementioned character winning out the conclusion of the show.

Music video
The official music video was first teased on April 20, 2019, and features a medieval theme, reminiscent of its source show Game of Thrones. It was directed by Anthony Mandler and released on May 5, 2019.

Charts

Certifications

Release history

References

External links
  
 

2019 singles
2019 songs
SZA songs
Travis Scott songs
The Weeknd songs
Songs written by the Weeknd
Songs written by Belly (rapper)
Songs written by DaHeala
Songs written by Ricky Reed
Music of Game of Thrones
Songs written by Travis Scott
Song recordings produced by the Weeknd
Music videos directed by Anthony Mandler